USS Bohio was an armed brig in commission in the United States Navy from 1861 to 1865. As part of the Union Navy, she saw service during the American Civil War.

Construction, acquisition, and commissioning 

Bohio was constructed as a civilian brig at Williamsburg in Brooklyn, New York, in 1856. The U.S. Navy purchased her on 9 September 1861 for service in the American Civil War and commissioned her on 30 December 1861 with Acting Master William D. Gregory in command.

Service history 
Bohio joined the Union Navy′s West Gulf Blockading Squadron in the Gulf of Mexico in January 1862 to take part in the Union blockade of Confederate ports and cruised along the coasts of Alabama and Louisiana. During 1862 she took four prizes and forced the scuttling of a fifth vessel. She joined the U.S. Navy screw steamer  in destroying the salt works along St. Andrew Bay in Florida between 24 November and 8 December 1862.

Bohio continued on blockade duty in the Gulf of Mexico, operating in Pensacola Bay off Florida and off the coast of Texas coast until March 1864, when she was converted into a coal vessel.

Final disposition 
Bohio was decommissioned at the New York Navy Yard in Brooklyn, New York, on 25 July 1865. She was sold there on 27 September 1865.

References  

Ships of the Union Navy
Brigs of the United States Navy
American Civil War patrol vessels of the United States
1856 ships
Ships built in Brooklyn